Jáchym Šíp (born 22 January 2003) is a Czech footballer who plays as a winger for Sigma Olomouc.

Club career
Šíp joined Sigma Olomouc at the age of 10, after playing youth football for TJ Loukov and Bystřice pod Hostýnem.

On 6 April 2021, Šíp made his debut for Sigma Olomouc, coming on as an 82nd-minute substitute in a 0–0 draw against Slovácko.

International career
Šíp has represented the Czech Republic at under-15, under-16 and under-17 level.

In September 2020, Šíp was handed a call-up for the Czech Republic senior team for a UEFA Nations League tie against Scotland after a new 24-man squad needed to be named following COVID-19 quarantine measures.

References

2003 births
Living people
People from Kroměříž
Czech footballers
Association football wingers
Czech Republic youth international footballers
SK Sigma Olomouc players
Czech First League players
Sportspeople from the Zlín Region